Pseudophilautus viridis, or the dull-green shrub frog, is a species of frogs in the family Rhacophoridae. It is endemic to Sri Lanka and occurs in the central hills of south-central Sri Lanka.

Description
Adult males measure  and females  in snout–vent length. Males usually have horn-like spinules in the dorsum; females are shagreened. The tympanum is not prominent whereas the supratympanic fold is distinct. The canthal edges are indistinct. The fingers are without webbing whereas the toes are medially webbed. The upper parts are light green, except for the upper edge of supratympanic fold and outer edge of upper eyelid that are yellow; some individuals are brown. The flanks are light yellow with light-blue patches. The upper lip is light yellowish-green and the lower one is white. Underparts are flesh coloured.

Habitat and conservation
The eggs are deposited in a deep hole in the forest floor that the female excavates.

It is an uncommon species whose habitat is declining because of encroachment by tea cultivation and human settlements.

References

viridis
Endemic fauna of Sri Lanka
Frogs of Sri Lanka
Taxa named by Rohan Pethiyagoda
Amphibians described in 2005
Taxonomy articles created by Polbot